Fey may refer to:

Places
 Féy, Moselle, France
 Fey, Switzerland

People
 Fey (name), and persons with the name
 Fey (singer) (born 1973), vocalist

Arts, entertainment, and media

Fictional entities
 Fey (Dungeons & Dragons), a fictional creature
 Fey, an alternative word for fairy or faerie

Music
 Fey (album), a 1995 recording by the singer of the same name
 "Fèy", a traditional vodou folk song in Haiti

Other uses
 Fey, an alternative spelling in English of the Hebrew letter fe

See also
 Faye (disambiguation)
 Fay (disambiguation)